Ozmas is a Christmas celebration in the Australian winter. 

Since the 19th Century, European immigrants to Australia have recognised Christmas's roots as a celebration of mid-winter and have explored ways of celebrating the shortest day of the year. The name "Ozmas" comes from combining 'Australia' and 'Christmas'.

References

External links 
 Oxford University Press Word of the Month

Christmas events and celebrations
Winter events in Australia